Poonkulanji is a village in Kollam (Quilon) district of India's Kerala state.

Institutions 

The village has a primary school Govt UP SCHOOL Poonkulanji.

Poonkulanji Post Office

Religions 

The villagers follow Christian, Hindu and Muslim faiths. The village has four Churches, Mar Thoma Syrian Church St. Pauls Marthoma Church Poonkulanji, a Hindu Temple and mosque.

Transportation

Roads
Transportation is mainly dependent on state run KSRTC buses. It is connected to Pathanapuram by frequent bus service that runs every hour.

Nearest places

Pathanapuram -7.5;km 
Kollam -48;km 
Trivandrum -84;km 
Adoor -23;km 
Punalur -13;km
Pathanamthitta -30;km
Alappuzha -91;km

References

External links
UP SCHOOL Poonkulanji
Poonkulanji Post Office
KSRTC Bus Route
Census of India
Poonkulanji Ward Election Result 2015

Villages in Kollam district